The following units of the British Armed Forces participated in the Battle of New Orleans on 8 January 1815. The American order of battle is shown separately.

British order of battle

British Army

General Staff 
 Commander-in-Chief: Major General the honourable Sir Edward Pakenham - killed 8 January 1815
 Deputy Commander-in-Chief: Major General Samuel Gibbs - died of wounds
 Military Secretary: Major Harry Smith
 Deputy Adjutant General: Lieutenant Colonel Frederick Stovin - wounded 24 December 1814
 Deputy Assistant Adjutant General: Brevet Major Henry Hooper - wounded 24 December 1814
 Acting Deputy Adjutant General: Captain Sir John Maxwell Tylden
 Acting Deputy Assistant Adjutant General: Captain Wood
 Senior Officer, Royal Artillery: Lieutenant Colonel Alexander Dickson
 Senior Officer, Royal Engineers: Lieutenant Colonel John Fox Burgoyne
 Senior Officer, Royal Staff Corps: Major Todd.
 Major of Brigade: Captain Henry Thomas Shaw (4th Foot) - wounded 8 January 1815
 Major of Brigade: Captain Thomas Wilkinson (85th Foot)- killed 8 January 1815
 Quarter Master General: Lieutenant Colonel John Bell
 Assistant Quarter Master General: Major Charles Ramus Forrest
 Deputy Assistant Quarter Master General: Lieutenant George de Lacy Evans - wounded on 24 December 1814 and 8 January 1815
 Deputy Assistant Quarter Master General: Lieutenant John Peddie.
 Naval aide de camp: Lieutenant (RN) The Honourable Edward Curzon
 Deputy Inspector of hospitals: Dr John Robb

Infantry Brigades

Artillery and supporting elements

Royal Navy

Native American allies 

- Brevet Major Edward Nicolls accompanied by less than 100 Seminole, Creek, and Choctaw warriors. Among them were the  Hitchiti Indian chief Kinache.

Notes and citations 
Notes

Citations

Bibliography

External links
British Army Infantry Muster Books and Pay Lists, 1812-1817 on Ancestry
War of 1812 casualties on FindMyPast
War of 1812 casualties project
British Troop Movements to North America in 1814 by Donald E. Graves

The Battle of New Orleans Order of Battle and Scenario Rules via warof1812wargaming.blogspot (no inline sources)

Orders of battle
War of 1812
Battles in the Gulf Theater 1813–1815